Regional Action (AR) was a small centre-right political party in pre-transition Spain. Founded in 1976 by former Francoist government minister Laureano López Rodó it was a self-defined Regionalist, conservative and Christian humanist party. Regional Action was one of the seven founding parties of the People's Alliance.

The party held their first general assembly on February 3, 1976, in Madrid, in which López Rodó was elected its President, José María Ruiz Gallardón, father of Madrid mayor Alberto Ruiz-Gallardón, was elected Secretary-General and José María Gamazo Manglano, Fernando Liñán y Zofío, Torcuata Luca de Tena, José María Manglano de la Lastra, Juan Alberto Valls and Julio Rodríguez Martínez Vice Presidents.

See also
 Catalan Regional Action
 People's Alliance

References

Conservative parties in Spain
Defunct political parties in Spain
Regionalist parties in Spain
Political parties established in 1976
Catholic political parties
Political parties disestablished in 1977